Metoxylamia variegator is a species of beetle in the family Cerambycidae, and the only species in the genus Metoxylamia. It was described by Per Olof Christopher Aurivillius in 1907. It is known from Ivory Coast and Cameroon.

References

Lamiini
Beetles described in 1907